Thoongathey Thambi Thoongathey is a 1983 Indian Tamil-language masala film directed by S. P. Muthuraman, starring Kamal Haasan in a double role, supported by Radha and Sulakshana. It was a blockbuster and completed a 275-day run at the box office.

Plot 

Gopi is an unemployed graduate from a middle class society and Vinod is a rich graduate from high society returning from abroad after his father's death. To claim the property of Vinod, the estate manager with his mob guys assaults him and make him a drug addict by repeated injections administered by a fake doctor. Gopi's lover Padmini's father, a family friend of Vinod's father, together with Padmini, come to the estate on an excursion. Due to her curiosity, she sees Vinod and finds out that he is in a dangerous state of health due to the drug addiction. Padmini later learns that Gopi and Vinod are twins separated at birth. With the help of the house's servant, Padmini replaces Vinod with Gopi and sends him to his mother's house to save him. Gopi takes it upon himself to save the estate and properties from the hands of Vinuchakravarthy, his accomplice and his assistant.

Cast 
 Kamal Haasan as Gopi and Vinod
 Radha as Padmini
 Sulakshana as Jayanthi
 Jamuna as Anu
 K. A. Thangavelu as Chandrasekar (Padmini's father)
 Vinu Chakravarthy as the estate manager
 Goundamani as the assistant of the estate manager
 Janagaraj as the fake doctor
 Senthamarai as the estate manager's accomplice
 Pasi Sathya
 Bindu Ghosh as Padmini's friend
 Dilip as Gopi's friend
Kuyili(actress) as Vinod's Dancer

Production 
After the success of Nadodi Mannan (1958), M. G. Ramachandran wanted his second directorial to be titled as Thoongathey Thambi Thoongathey named after the song from the film, however the project was shelved. In 1983, AVM Productions launched a film with the same name starring Kamal Haasan. Kamal portrayed two distinct roles, and the cinematographer Babu used mask shots to differentiate the roles.

The song "Summa Nikkathinga" was shot at Vijaya Gardens. To shoot an expensive climax involving helicopter chase, makers took inspiration from the climax of Hindi film Dil Kaa Heera at the insistence of journalist Manian by taking long shots of bursting helicopter from that film and matched along with the actors. It was Visu's idea to have helicopter chase at climax, to establish it Kamal's character was introduced by getting down from helicopter.

Soundtrack 

The music was composed by Ilaiyaraaja and lyrics for all songs were written by Vaali. For the Malayalam-dubbed version Vasantholsavam, all lyrics were written by Poovachal Khader, and Rajasri wrote the lyrics for the Telugu-dubbed version Jalsa Rayudu. The song "Naanaga Naanillai" was well received and it based on Chandrakauns raga which resembles Hindolam. In early 2020, during the COVID-19 pandemic in India, a version of "Varuthu Varuthu" with rewritten lyrics spreading awareness about COVID-19, became viral.

Release 
Thoongathey Thambi Thoongathey was released on 4 November 1983, and completed a 275-day run at the box office.

References

Bibliography

External links 
 

1980s masala films
1980s Tamil-language films
1983 films
AVM Productions films
Films directed by S. P. Muthuraman
Films scored by Ilaiyaraaja
Films with screenplays by Panchu Arunachalam
Twins in Indian films